Karl Edvard Johanson (1882 in Förlösa – 1936) was a Swedish trade union organizer. By profession he was a shoemaker, and belonged to the Swedish Shoe and Leather Workers' Union. He was the chairman of the Swedish Trade Union Confederation from 1930, when he succeeded Albert Forslund, to 1936, when he was succeeded by Arvid Thorberg.

References

Swedish trade unionists
1882 births
1936 deaths